Andic is a surname. Notable people with the surname include:

Furkan Andıç (born 1990), Turkish actor and model
Isak Andic (born 1953), Spanish businessman
Marko Anđić (born 1983), Serbian football player

See also
Proto-Avar-Andic, the unattested, reconstructed proto-language of the Avar–Andic languages, part of the Northeast Caucasian languages
Avar–Andic languages, one of the seven main branches of Northeast Caucasian language family
Andic languages, a branch of the Northeast Caucasian language family
Andic soil or Andosol, soils found in volcanic areas formed in volcanic tephra